Yurmiyazbash (Yurmiyaźbaş) is a rural locality (a village) in Kurdymsky Selsoviet, Tatyshlinsky District, Bashkortostan, Russia. The population was 72 as of 2010. There are 2 streets.

Geography 
Yurmiyazbash is located 26 km southwest of Verkhniye Tatyshly (the district's administrative centre) by road. Stary Kurdym is the nearest rural locality.

References 

Rural localities in Tatyshlinsky District